Clelia Bompiani-Battaglia (5 August 1848, in Rome – 23 February 1927, in Rome) was an Italian painter. 

She was a pupil of her father, Roberto Bompiani, and of the professors in the Accademia di San Luca. She was an accomplished watercolorist.

The following paintings in watercolor established her reputation as an artist: Confidential Communication ( (1885); the Fortune-Teller (1887); A Public Copyist (1888); and The Wooing (1888). 

Along with Alceste Campriani, Ada Negri, Juana Romani, and Erminia de Sanctis, Bompiani is named as one of Italy's best modern painters.

Gallery

References

Bibliography

1847 births
1927 deaths
19th-century Italian painters
19th-century Italian women artists
20th-century Italian painters
20th-century Italian women artists
Painters from Rome
Italian watercolourists
Sibling artists
Italian women painters
Women watercolorists